Red Rum (3 May 1965 – 18 October 1995) was an Irish champion Thoroughbred steeplechaser. He achieved an unmatched historic treble when he won the Grand National in 1973, 1974 and 1977, and also came second in the two intervening years, 1975 and 1976. The Grand National is a notoriously difficult race that has been described as "the ultimate test of a horse’s courage". He was also renowned for his jumping ability, having not fallen in 100 races.

The 1973 race in which Red Rum secured his comeback victory from 30 lengths behind is often considered one of the greatest Grand Nationals in history. In a 2002 UK poll, Red Rum's historic third triumph in the Grand National was voted the 24th greatest sporting moment of all time.

Early life
Red Rum was bred at Rossenarra stud in Kells, County Kilkenny, Ireland, by Martyn McEnery. His sire was Quorum (1954–1971), and his dam Mared (1958–1976). Mared was a granddaughter of the broodmare Batika, whose other descendants have included the Irish 2000 Guineas winner Turtle Island. McEnery gave Red Rum his name by taking the last three letters of the names of his dam and sire, respectively. Bred to win one-mile races, Red Rum won his National titles over the longest distance, four miles and four furlongs. He started his career running in low-value races as a sprinter and dead-heated in his first race, a five-furlong flat race at Aintree Racecourse. He ran another seven times as a two-year-old, winning over 7f at Warwick, and over the same distance at Doncaster in the first of his two races as a three-year-old. In his early career, he was twice ridden by Lester Piggott. The comedian Lee Mack, then a stable boy, had his first riding lesson on Red Rum.

After being passed from training yard to training yard, he found his footing when Southport car dealer Ginger McCain bought him for his client Noel le Mare and famously trained the horse on the sands at Southport, England. Galloping through sea water may have proved highly beneficial to Red Rum’s hooves. McCain reportedly took Red Rum for a therapeutic swim in the sea off Southport before his first National appearances to help treat the horse's pedal osteitis, a debilitating, incurable bone disease in his hoof. McCain also won the Grand National in 2004 with Amberleigh House, 31 years after his first victory with Red Rum.

Grand National record

At the 1973 Grand National, Red Rum beat the Australian chaser Crisp, which was carrying 23 pounds more, in a new record time of nine minutes, 1.9 seconds. Crisp led the field virtually all the way in that year's National in which he was 30 lengths clear, and at the last fence was 15 lengths clear of Red Rum, his nearest pursuer. Red Rum and jockey Brian Fletcher, however, made up the ground on the final stretch and, two strides from the finishing post, pipped the tiring Crisp to win by three-quarters of a length in what is often considered one of the greatest Grand Nationals in history. Crisp's jockey Richard Pitman later stated: "I still dream about that race, of Crisp running so strongly and jumping so fearlessly, and then the sound of Red Rum's hooves as he got closer and closer at the end." He added: "I felt as though I was tied to a railway line with an express train thundering up and being unable to jump out of the way." A year later, Red Rum retained his title at the 1974 National, carrying 12 stone. (He followed that with victory in the Scottish Grand National, and remains the only horse to win both in the same season.)

Red Rum came second in 1975 and 1976; Tommy Stack replaced Fletcher as jockey in the last race after Fletcher angered trainer Ginger McCain by telling the press the horse no longer felt right after a defeat in a race away from Aintree. Again, Red Rum saved his best for Aintree but was held off by Rag Trade. The following year, Stack rode the 12-year-old Red Rum to his record third Grand National triumph, in what is regarded as one of the greatest moments in horse racing history.

Retirement
Red Rum was prepared for a sixth attempt at the Grand National the season following his 1977 win, but suffered a hairline fracture in the lead up to the 1978 race. Following a canter at Aintree Racecourse the day before the 1978 Grand National he was retired. The news of Red Rum's retirement was the lead story on that night's 9 O'Clock News on BBC1 and was also front page news of the following morning's newspapers.

Red Rum had become a national celebrity, opening supermarkets and annually leading the Grand National parade for many further years. His likeness graced playing cards, mugs, posters, models, paintings, plates and jigsaw puzzles. Several books have been written about Red Rum by his trainer, sculptor, jockeys and author Ivor Herbert; a children's story about his life was also written by Christine Pemberton. The horse helped open the Steeplechase rollercoaster at Blackpool Pleasure Beach in 1977. He also switched on the Blackpool Illuminations that year. In 1975, a song entitled "Red Rum" was issued as a tribute to him by a group named Chaser, on Polydor 2058 564. It was written by Steve Jolley, Richard Palmer and Tony Swain. In 2010 the name of the racecourse bar, formerly called "The Sefton", was changed to "The Red Rum".

In 1977 Red Rum appeared as a studio guest at the BBC Sports Personality of the Year awards ceremony. Viewers were delighted when the horse seemed to recognise the voice of his jockey Tommy Stack, who was appearing by video link from another location.

Death and legacy

Red Rum died on 18 October 1995, aged 30. His death was one of the lead items in television news bulletins and also made the front pages of national newspapers the next day.

He was buried at the winning post of the Aintree Racecourse, which is still a destination for his fans. The epitaph reads
Respect this place
This hallowed ground
A legend here
His rest has found
His feet would fly
Our spirits soar
He earned our love
For evermore

Eleven years after his death, a survey found he remained the best-known racehorse in the  UK. When asked to name an equine animal, Red Rum was named by 45% of Britons, with Black Beauty (from Anna Sewell's novel) in second with 33%.  In 2002 the UK public voted Red Rum's third Grand National win #24 in the list of the 100 Greatest Sporting Moments.

In the early 1970s, the future running of the Grand National was uncertain. The emergence of Red Rum and his historic triumphs captivated the nation, and ensured huge public support for the fund to buy Aintree and put it in the hands of the Jockey Club.

On 19 September 2011, Red Rum's trainer Ginger McCain died aged 80.

Grand National record

Commemorations

Red Rum Handicap Chase at Aintree.
There are statues of Red Rum at Aintree Racecourse, in Southport and at Ayr Racecourse.
Merseyrail named one of its trains in Red Rum's honour in 2008 as part of a Merseyside Legends programme.
There used to be two pubs named Red Rum.
 One was next to Aintree Racecourse; it is now a tandoori restaurant.
 One was in Croxteth, but closed some time in the mid-2000s and was demolished in 2010
 Southport Fire Station took delivery of an engine they named Red Rum in 1979
 Red Rum Drive in Ashburn, Virginia, a suburb of Washington, D.C. (part of the area referred to as the silicon valley of the east), is named after the famous racehorse, due to the land developer being an avid horse racing fan.
 Red Rum Close in Fazakerley, Liverpool.

Pedigree

See also

List of historical horses
Repeat winners of horse races
1973 Grand National

Notes and references

External links

 
 Red Rum visiting Blakely Green, W.Midlands
 Red Rum Aintree Grand National 1973
 Red Rum's site
 The Kumbi Site
 Video (RealPlayer) - Ginger McCain talks to Sue Barker about Red Rum in 2002
 Video (YouTube) BBC News Report of Red Rum's death

1965 racehorse births
1995 racehorse deaths
Horse monuments
Grand National winners
National Hunt racehorses
Racehorses bred in Ireland
Racehorses trained in the United Kingdom
Thoroughbred family 25